Acacia racospermoides is a shrub or tree of the genus Acacia and the subgenus Plurinerves that is endemic to an area of northeastern Australia.

Description
Like most species of Acacia it has phyllodes rather than true leaves.

Taxonomy
The species was first formally described as Acacia racospermoides by the botanist Leslie Pedley in 1990 as a part of the work New combinations in Acacia Miller (Leguminosae: Mimosoideae) as published in the journal Austrobaileya. It was originally described in 1987 by Pedley as Racosperma paniculatum before being transferred to the Acacia genus.

Distribution
It is native to coastal areas in north eastern Queensland where it has a scattered distribution from around Bathurst Bay in the north down to around Cooktown in the south with other outlying populations around Cairns and on Hinchinbrook Island. It is found growing in  sandy soils as a part of open forest and heathland communities.

See also
List of Acacia species

References

racospermoides
Taxa named by Leslie Pedley
Flora of Queensland
Plants described in 1990